Bernardino Carboni  (died 1779) was an Italian decorator and wood sculptor of the Baroque period, mainly active in Brescia.

He helped prepare the celebrations for 5 January 1779 to celebrate the accession to a cardinal of Lodovico Calini. His brother Domenico, also engaged in this type of decoration, as well as architecture, died at age 41 in 1768. The third brother, Giambattista born 1729, was a sculptor, painter, and writer of Le Pitture e Sculture di Brescia.

References

Artists from Brescia
18th-century Italian sculptors
Italian male sculptors
Italian art historians
Italian Baroque sculptors
Italian decorators
Year of death unknown
Year of birth unknown
18th-century Italian male artists